This is a list of Argentine films which were released in 2014:

See also
2014 in Argentina

External links
Feature Films Released In 2014 With Country of Origin Argentina at IMDb

2014
Argentina